This is a list of education institutions in Delhi, India.

Universities 
In Delhi there are 7 central universities, 10 state universities and 11 deemed universities. The status of one institute, the National School of Drama, is unclear. Delhi also has an international university established by the eight member nations of South Asian Association for Regional Co-operation (SAARC).

  granted deemed/state/central university status
  The National School of Drama was granted deemed university status in 2005. However, in 2011 the status was revoked on the institute's request. Its current status is unclear.

Fake universities
There are some fake universities functioning in Delhi. According to the University Grants Commission (UGC), the  following are the names of fake universities.

 ADR-Centric Juridical University
 Al-Qatai University, New Delhi
 Commercial University Ltd., Daryaganj, Delhi
 National Education Management & Technology Studies (NEMTS or NEM)
 United Nations University, Delhi
 Varanaseya Sanskrit Vishwavidyalaya, Varanasi (UP), Jagatpuri, Delhi
 Vocational University, Delhi
 Indira Gandhi University, Delhi

Colleges
See also list of colleges under Guru Gobind Singh Indraprastha University.
 Bhagwan Parshuram Institute of Technology
 Ambedkar Institute of Technology
 Govind Ballabh Pant Engineering College
Maharaja Surajmal Institute of Technology
 Maharaja Agrasen Institute of Technology, Rohini
 Jagannath International Management School, Kalkaji
 National Power Training Institute
 New Delhi Institute of Management
 Trinity Institute of Professional Studies
 University School of Biotechnology	
 University School of Chemical Technology	
 University School of Information Technology
 University School of Management Studies	
 Vardhman Mahavir Medical College

See also list of faculties and centers under Jamia Millia Islamia University.
 AJK, Mass Communication Research Centre
 Sarojini Naidu Centre for Women's Studies

See also List of colleges under Delhi University.
 Acharya Narendra Dev College
 AJK, Mass Communication Research Centre, Jamia Millia Islamia, New Delhi
 Amity Law School
 Apeejay Institute of Design
 Aryabhatta College
 Bhaskaracharya College of Applied Sciences
 Bhim Rao Ambedkar College
 Bird Education Society for Travel & Tourism
 Ch. Brahm Prakash Government Engineering College
 College of Vocational Studies
 Deen Dayal Upadhyaya College
 Delhi Music Academy
 Delhi School of Music
 Gargi College
 Government Engineering College
 Indian Institute of Planning and Management (IIPM)
 Kirori Mal College
 Maulana Azad Medical College
 Miranda House
 Mount Carmel Business School
 Shaheed Sukhdev College of Business Studies
 Sri Venkateswara College
 Ram Lal Anand College
 PGDAV College

References

Education in Delhi
Delhi
Institutions of higher education